Margery and Gladys is a one-off television drama/film, broadcast on 21 September 2003. Starring Penelope Keith and June Brown as the title characters, it was produced by Carlton Television for ITV and directed by Geoffrey Sax. Upon first broadcast, it was watched by a total of 7.91 million viewers.

The film was also screened on RTÉ One in Ireland. It was subsequently repeated on ITV3 on 6 March 2016, its first repeat in the United Kingdom since its original broadcast in 2003. The film was released on DVD in Australia in July 2012 by Madman Entertainment.

Plot
Recently widowed Margery Heywood (Penelope Keith) and her cleaning woman Gladys Gladwell (June Brown) disturb a would-be burglar breaking into Margery's house in Kent. Margery attacks the burglar with a heavy glass vase, and knocks him unconscious. Believing that she has killed him, she panics and flees the house with Gladys, leaving behind her handbag. In Gladys's car, the two women decide to try to reach Margery's son Graham in Milton Keynes, hoping he'll give them shelter and money, but the trip turns into a comedy of disasters.

They are forced to break into a pharmacy to obtain insulin for Gladys's diabetes, 'do a runner' from a petrol station and dodge police cameras on the M25. Margery is devastated to learn of a twenty-year affair between her late husband and Gladys - and that her son knew of it. His father also secretly bought a boat and planned to sail away with a childhood friend. With the police, led by about-to-retire Detective Inspector Woolley (Roger Lloyd-Pack) on their trail, the two women drive to Fleetwood, only to meet the childhood friend. The boat, it seems, was purchased with stolen money. After a night on the town at nearby Blackpool, the two women take the boat and sail off to the Caribbean.

Cast
 Penelope Keith as Margery Heywood
 June Brown as Gladys Gladwell
 Roger Lloyd Pack as D.I. Wooley
 Martin Freeman as D.S. Stringer
 Alan David as Gordon Thompson
 Marcia Warren as Jean Thompson
 Adam Godley as Graham Heywood
 Peter Vaughan as Troy Gladwell
 Ken Morley as Bill Nightingale
 Kulvinder Ghir as Mr. Singh
 Ivana Basic as Nina Kovacs
 Richard Ridings as Terry Mason
 Matthew Lockwood as Scott Wilkins
 Tilly Vosburgh as Mrs. Wilkins

References

External links

2003 television films
2003 films
British television films
Films directed by Geoffrey Sax
ITV television dramas
Carlton Television
Television series by ITV Studios
2000s English-language films